The Vanguard School is an approved private school in Malvern, Chester County, Pennsylvania, United States, approximately 22 miles northwest of Philadelphia on the campus of Valley Forge Educational Services.

History

The Vanguard School was founded in 1959 by child psychologist Dr. Milton Brutten. It was initially located in Haverford, Pennsylvania. In 1962, the Lower School transferred to a newly purchased campus on North Valley Road in Malvern. Vanguard became the first private school in the Commonwealth approved under PA Act 318 to receive tuition assistance for children whose needs could not be served in their local public schools. The Vanguard Concept was then set up in 1964-1969 in Lake Wales, Florida, as a boarding school as the Vanguard School (Florida) and as day schools in Coconut Grove (Vanguard School of Coconut Grove) and Fort Lauderdale, Florida and other locations. These schools no longer affiliate with Vanguard (PA).

Governance
Valley Forge Educational Services (VFES), a Pennsylvania-based nonprofit organization offering educational, summer camp, and employment-based programming to children and adults with disabilities, operates the Vanguard School.

The Vanguard School is an Approved Private School providing programs for and licensed to accept students, 4–21 years of age, with a Pennsylvania Department of Special Education exceptionality of autism, speech-language disorders, emotional disturbance, or other health impairment (OHI).

The Pennsylvania Department of Education has authorized The Vanguard School to receive funding from school districts and the state to provide an appropriate education to students with disabilities. The School serves students from more than 56 school districts from 9 counties.

Curriculum

The Vanguard School provides comprehensive special education and related clinical services with a unique focus on the individual student and their readiness for life. The school offers an integrated academic, social, and daily living skills approach within a supportive environment where the goal is for each student to become a contributing community member.

A team of therapists supports students in the classroom, individually and in small groups, as well as through consultative efforts. Related clinical services include speech-language, occupational and physical therapies, school psychology, counseling, behavior support, and nursing. All therapists and specialists can be actively involved in the student's entire day; our clinicians co-treat across disciplines and consult with teachers and other professionals regularly.

The school is a Pennsylvania Approved Private School serving students 4–21 years of age with exceptionalities, including autism, emotional disturbance, speech-language impairment, specific learning disability, and other health impairments. Every Vanguard School student has an individualized education program (IEP) created in concert with the home school district and parents to provide each student with appropriate services and therapies to meet their individual needs.

Speech-Language Intensive Classrooms-The speech-language intensive (SLI) classrooms serve students with complex communication needs that significantly impact their ability to communicate effectively. The classrooms utilize a collaborative model between the classroom teacher and the speech-language pathologist (SLP). SLI classrooms are language-rich environments that offer a combination of 1:1 and small-group instruction designed to support the intense language needs of the students. An SLI classroom is self-contained with a certified special education teacher, a classroom aide, and an assigned SLP. The classroom teacher and SLP collaborate to generalize student skills, provide appropriate visual supports, and develop student independence. The SLP is in the classroom for daily push-in support during various classroom periods (e.g., reading, daily living skills, facilitated play, etc.) to encourage carry-over and generalize student goals.

Intensive Therapeutic Classrooms-These classrooms are for students who need additional support because of the frequency and intensity of their behavioral difficulties. The school's interdisciplinary team consisted of a board-certified behavior analyst, clinical social worker, certified special education teacher, and classroom aide focused on teaching students evidence-based behavioral and emotional regulation skills, problem-solving skills, and managing frustration and anger.

The Vanguard Transition Center-As part of The Vanguard School, students 18–21 years of age receive continuing education, counseling, self-advocacy training, career exploration, and community-based vocational experiences.

An Extended School Year (ESY) program is offered through Valley Forge Educational Services' Summer Matters division. ESY is a program for eligible students from Vanguard School and neighboring districts. It is designed to maintain skills and reduce academic and behavioral regression during summer by incorporating students' educational, social, behavioral, and vocational needs from individual IEP goals.

The Vocational Immersion Program (VIP) equips young adults with developmental disabilities, including autism spectrum disorder and related social challenges, 18–24 years of age, with critical social and employment-readiness skills through a four-week intensive program that includes classroom-based instruction, online learning, workplace internships with job coaches and a week-long supported living experience.

Customized Workforce Solutions (CWS) provides employment-related services to adults with disabilities. We focus on person-centered support and training to help job seekers attain their employment goals. Our process allows adults to define their goals, understand their skills and discover their vocational interests and work preferences.

References

External links 

Private elementary schools in Pennsylvania
Private middle schools in Pennsylvania
Private high schools in Pennsylvania
Schools in Chester County, Pennsylvania
1959 establishments in Pennsylvania
Educational institutions established in 1959